Drillia poecila is a species of sea snail, a marine gastropod mollusk in the family Drilliidae.

Description
The size of an adult shell varies between 29 mm and 50 mm.

Distribution
This species occurs in the demersal zone of the Western Central Pacific Ocean off the Philippines and New Caledonia at a depth of 250 m.

References

 Sysoev A. & Bouchet P. (2001) New and uncommon turriform gastropods (Gastropoda: Conoidea) from the South-West Pacific. In: P. Bouchet & B.A. Marshall (eds), Tropical Deep-Sea Benthos, volume 22. Mémoires du Muséum National d'Histoire Naturelle 185: 271–320. 
  Tucker, J.K. 2004 Catalog of recent and fossil turrids (Mollusca: Gastropoda). Zootaxa 682:1-1295

External links
 
 Bouchet, Philippe, et al. "A quarter-century of deep-sea malacological exploration in the South and West Pacific: where do we stand? How far to go." Tropical deep-sea Benthos 25 (2008): 9-40
 Holotype at MNHN, Paris

poecila
Gastropods described in 2001